The 2016–17 Men's FIH Hockey World League Round 2 was held in March and April 2017. A total of 24 teams competing in three events took part in this round of the tournament playing for 8 berths in the Semifinals, played in June and July 2017.

Qualification
9 teams ranked between 12th and 20th in the FIH World Rankings current at the time of seeking entries for the competition qualified automatically. However, South Africa was chosen to host a Semifinal, hence exempt from Round 2 and leaving 8 teams qualified. Additionally 14 teams qualified from Round 1 as well as two nations that did not meet ranking criteria and were exempt from Round 1 to host a Round 2 tournament. The following 24 teams, shown with final pre-tournament rankings, competed in this round of the tournament.

Dhaka
Dhaka, Bangladesh, 4–12 March 2017.

All times are local (UTC+6).

First round

Pool A

Pool B

Second round

Bracket

5–8th place bracket

Quarterfinals

Fifth to eighth place classification

Crossover

Seventh and eighth place

Fifth and sixth place

First to fourth place classification

Semifinals

Third and fourth place

Final

Final ranking

Belfast
Belfast, Northern Ireland, 11–19 March 2017.

All times are local (UTC±0).

First round

Pool A

Pool B

Second round

Bracket

5–8th place bracket

Quarterfinals

Fifth to eighth place classification

Crossover

Seventh and eighth place

Fifth and sixth place

First to fourth place classification

Semifinals

Third and fourth place

Final

Final ranking

Tacarigua
Tacarigua, Trinidad and Tobago, 25 March–2 April 2017.

All times are local (UTC−4).

First round

Pool A

Pool B

Second round

Bracket

5–8th place bracket

Quarterfinals

Fifth to eighth place classification

Crossover

Seventh and eighth place

Fifth and sixth place

First to fourth place classification

Semifinals

Third and fourth place

Final

Final ranking

References

External links
Official website (Dhaka)
Official website (Belfast)
Official website (Tacarigua)

Round 2
International field hockey competitions hosted by Ireland
International field hockey competitions hosted by Bangladesh
International field hockey competitions hosted by Trinidad and Tobago